Acetylenedicarboxylic acid or butynedioic acid is an organic compound (a dicarboxylic acid) with the formula C4H2O4 or . It is a crystalline solid that is soluble in diethyl ether.

The removal of two protons yields the acetylenedicarboxylate dianion , which consists only of carbon and oxygen, making it an oxocarbon anion.  Partial ionization yields the monovalent hydrogenacetylenedicarboxylate anion .

The acid was first described in 1877 by Polish chemist Ernest Bandrowski. It can be obtained by treating α,β-dibromosuccinic acid with potassium hydroxide KOH in methanol or ethanol.  The reaction yields potassium bromide and potassium acetylenedicarboxylate.  The salts are separated and the latter is treated with sulfuric acid.

Acetylenedicarboxylic acid is used in the synthesis of dimethyl acetylenedicarboxylate, an important laboratory reagent.  The acid is commonly traded as a laboratory chemical. It can also be reacted with sulfur tetrafluoride to produce hexafluoro-2-butyne, a powerful dienophile for use in Diels-Alder reactions. 

Fatty alcohol esters of acetylenedicarboxylic acid can be used for the preparation of phase change materials (PCM).

Anions and salts
The anion can be derived from acetylenedicarboxylic acid by removal of a single proton or from the acetylenedicarboxylate dianion by addition of a proton. The name is also used for any salt of this anion. Salts of this anion are of interest in crystallography because they contain unusually short and strong hydrogen bonds. In many crystalline salts (with the exception of the lithium one), the HADC units form linear chains connected by strong hydrogen bonds. Each carboxylate group is usually planar; but the two groups may lie in different planes due to rotation about the carbon–carbon bonds.

It is often called potassium hydrogen acetylenedicarboxylate or monopotassium acetylenedicarboxylate. The salt can be obtained from acetylenedicarboxylic acid and is a common laboratory starting material for the synthesis of other derivatives of that acid. In the crystalline form, the hydrogenacetylenedicarboxylate anions are joined into linear chains by uncommonly short hydrogen bonds.

Acetylenedicarboxylate (often abbreviated as ADC or adc) is a divalent anion with formula  or [O2C–C≡C–CO2]2−; or any salt or ester thereof.  The anion can be derived from acetylenedicarboxylic acid  by the loss of two protons.  It is one of several oxocarbon anions which, like carbonate  and oxalate , consist solely of carbon and oxygen.  The ADC anion can at as a ligand in organometallic complexes, such as the blue polymeric complex with copper(II) and 2,2′-bipyridine, .  Thallium(I) acetylenedicarboxylate (Tl2C4O4) decomposes at 195 °C, leaving a residue of pyrophoric thallium powder.

See also
 Acetylenedicarboxylate decarboxylase
 Oxalic acid
 Acetylenediol

References

Alkyne derivatives
Dicarboxylic acids